Escape from Hell (German: Flucht aus der Hölle) is a 1928 German silent drama film directed by Georg Asagaroff and starring Jean Murat, Ágnes Eszterházy and Louis Ralph.

The film's art direction was by Alexander Ferenczy.

Cast
 Jean Murat as Erik Ward  
 Ágnes Eszterházy 
 Louis Ralph 
 Paul Heidemann 
 Raimondo Van Riel
 Fritz Alberti 
 Harry Frank 
 Leo Peukert 
 Else Reval 
 Leopold von Ledebur 
 Nikolaus von Lovrie 
 Aruth Wartan

References

Bibliography
 Alfred Krautz. International directory of cinematographers, set- and costume designers in film, Volume 4. Saur, 1984.

External links

1928 films
Films of the Weimar Republic
German silent feature films
Films directed by Georg Asagaroff
1928 drama films
German drama films
Films set on Devil's Island
German black-and-white films
German prison films
Silent drama films
1920s German films
1920s German-language films